The red-cheek wrasse (Thalassoma genivittatum) is a species of wrasse native to the western Indian Ocean, where it can be found on rocky reefs at depths from . This species can also be found in the aquarium trade.

References

External links
 

Thalassoma
Labridae
Fish described in 1839